Washington Alexis Viera Barreto (born 18 October 1978), commonly known as Alexis Viera, is a retired Uruguayan footballer who played as a goalkeeper. He holds Italian citizenship. Currently, he is assistant coach of his last club Atlético F.C. (previously Dépor).

Club career
Viera began his career in Uruguayan Segunda División club Racing Club de Montevideo in 1995. The next year, Viera was transferred to Peñarol, with which he won the 1996 Uruguayan Primera División, with just 18 years old. In 1998 Viera returns to Racing Club de Montevideo, who was promoted to the Primera División in 2000, but was relegated back to the Segunda División in 2002.

In 2003, he is acquired by River Plate de Montevideo, with which he won the 2004 Segunda División. Viera was transferred to Nacional in 2006, with which he won 2005–06 Uruguayan Primera División. Viera's performance against Boca Juniors in the 2006 Copa Sudamericana allowed his team to advance to the quarterfinals, where they was eliminated by Atlético Paranaense.

Viera was acquired by Colombian club América de Cali in 2009, but it was not until 4 October that debuted for the team, against Deportivo Pereira, due to an injury that kept him from playing. Viera scored his first professional goal on 3 April 2010 from penalty kick, in the match against Millonarios that ended in a 3–2 win. At that same match Viera saves two penalties, which was admired by several Colombian media. Viera left the club in the middle of the year due to lack of payment, caused by the economic crisis in which the team was.

In August 2010, Viera was acquired by the Chilean club Ñublense, with which was runner-up of the 2012 Primera División B. In 2013, Viera returns to América de Cali, where scored 4 goals, all from penalty kick, reaching 5 goals with the team and so tying with Julio César Falcioni in the most goalscoring goalkeeper of the team. He scored a total of 7 goals with América de Cali. In mid-2015, he joins Colombian Primera B club Dépor.

On August 25, 2015 he was attacked and shot twice in the chest by robbers and sustained injuries to his lung and thoracic vertebra, which briefly left him unable to use his legs. He is currently undergoing recovery in Cali where he reunited with family members he had not seen since being shot. After half a year without playing, Viera retired from professional football and became assistant coach of his last club.

Career statistics
This table is incomplete, thus some stats and totals could be incorrect.

Honours
Nacional
Primera División (1): 2005–06

Ñublense
Primera División B
Runner-up (1): 2012

Peñarol
Primera División (1): 1996

River Plate de Montevideo
Segunda División (1): 2004

See also
List of goalscoring goalkeepers

External links
Alexis Viera's profile at América de Cali Official Website

References

1978 births
Living people
Uruguayan footballers
Footballers from Montevideo
Association football goalkeepers
Racing Club de Montevideo players
Peñarol players
Club Atlético River Plate (Montevideo) players
Club Nacional de Football players
América de Cali footballers
Ñublense footballers
Expatriate footballers in Chile
Expatriate footballers in Colombia
Uruguayan expatriate footballers
Uruguayan expatriate sportspeople in Colombia
Uruguayan expatriate sportspeople in Chile
Atlético F.C. footballers